George Edward Ingledew (3 January 1903 – 1979) was an English professional footballer who played as an inside left.

Career
Born in Sheffield, Ingledew signed for Bradford City in March 1926 from Wombwell, leaving the club in September 1927 to play for Wath Athletic. During his time with Bradford City he made four appearances in the Football League.

Sources

References

1903 births
1979 deaths
English footballers
Wombwell F.C. players
Bradford City A.F.C. players
Wath Athletic F.C. players
English Football League players
Association football inside forwards
Footballers from Sheffield